Preeyasakhi Radha is a 1982 Indian Malayalam-language film, directed by K. P. Pillai and produced by Ambalathara Divakaran. The film stars Lakshmi, Prathap Pothen, M. G. Soman and Priya. The film's score was composed by V. Dakshinamoorthy.

Cast
Lakshmi
Prathap Pothen
M. G. Soman
Priya
Sujatha

Soundtrack
The music was composed by V. Dakshinamoorthy with lyrics by Sreekumaran Thampi.

References

External links
 

1982 films
1980s Malayalam-language films